Statistics of Swiss National League A in the 1987–88 football season.

Overview
It was contested by 12 teams, and Neuchâtel Xamax won the championship.

First stage

Table

Results

Second stage

Championship group

Table

Results

Promotion/relegation group

Group A

Table

Results

Group B

Table

Results

Sources
 Switzerland 1987–88 at RSSSF

Swiss Football League seasons
Swiss
1987–88 in Swiss football